The Sahryń massacre was a massacre of Ukrainian combatants and civilians by members of the Polish Home Army on 10 March 1944, committed as a reprisal to similar, though en masse, attacks carried out on Polish villagers by the Ukrainian Insurgent Army. The exact total death toll of Ukrainians killed in Sahryń is unknown, but estimates vary from 234 to over 600, of which between 150 and 300 were confirmed civilians. The surnames of 234 victims are known.

History
In the spring of 1944, Sahryń was one of 150 Ukrainian villages (with its prewar Polish minority already deported), which was burned down by Polish partisans during the conflict of ethnic cleansing with Ukrainian OUN-UPA, along the Curzon Line. The conflict "continued throughout June 1944, resulting in considerable bloodshed  and the destruction of dozens of Polish and Ukrainian villages". Sahryń was the site of the initial thrust of the AK counter-offensive against UPA, under the command of Lieutenant Zenon Jachymek, due to Ukrainian self-defence stationing there.

At dawn on 10 March 1944 the AK unit from Division Hrubieszow attacked the fortified village. A heavy fighting broke out. The Ukrainians retreated, but both Catholic and Orthodox churches in Sahryń were burned down. Between 150 and 300 civilians were killed by Polish forces in reprisal and 260 farmhouses were set on fire.

Aftermath
Historian Mariusz Zajączkowski said that the massacre could be described as a war crime or perhaps a crime against humanity. The Institute of National Remembrance  (IPN) investigation on this matter was discontinued in 2010, and the IPN denied that any crime had been committed against the Ukrainian civilians in Sahryń. A Ukrainian request to reopen the investigation was refused.

The monument in memory of the Ukrainian victims of AK in Sahryń awaits its official unveiling. It was erected in 2009, with the hope that both Ukrainian and Polish presidents would attend the ceremonies, but there were spelling errors discovered in the names. The monument was built by the Ukrainian side, with Polish participation.

References

See also
Massacres of Poles in Volhynia and Eastern Galicia
Pawłokoma massacre

Massacres of Ukrainians during World War II
Military operations involving the Home Army
March 1944 events
1944 crimes in Poland
Polish war crimes
Massacres of Ukrainians by Poles